Erin Margaret Schuman, born May 15, 1963 in California, USA, is a neurobiologist who studies neuronal synapses. She is currently a Director at the Max Planck Institute for Brain Research.

Career
Erin Schuman attended the University of Southern California (USC), where she received her B.A. in Psychology (1985). She continued her education to obtain a Ph.D. in Neuroscience from Princeton University (1990). She conducted postdoctoral research from 1990–1993 in Daniel V. Madison’s lab in the Molecular and Cellular Physiology Department at Stanford University. From there, Schuman was recruited to join the faculty in the Division of Biology at the California Institute of Technology where she moved up the ranks from Assistant to Full Professor. During this time, she was also appointed investigator at the Howard Hughes Medical Institute. In 2009, she was recruited as the Director of Max Planck Institute for Brain Research in Frankfurt am Main, Germany, at which she holds her current position.

Research
The Schuman lab studies the properties of mRNAs and proteins (e.g. the transcriptomes and proteomes) distributed throughout the neuron. Her research has examined how stability in neuronal processes can be brought about by local cell biological processes, like protein synthesis, allowing synapses to respond rapidly and appropriately to changing stimuli. The Schuman lab demonstrated the first functional role for local translation in neurons. In 1996, in the course of exploring how neurotrophins enhance synaptic transmission, Schuman together with graduate student Hyejin Kang made the discovery that local protein synthesis within dendrites is required for this form of synaptic plasticity. She obtained direct proof that protein synthesis occurs in intact, isolated dendrites. This, together with a few other key observations, gave birth to the field of local translation. Her team discovered, using next generation sequencing, over 2500 mRNAs localized to the neuropil. In addition, Schuman and collaborators (Dave Tirrell, Caltech and Daniela Dieterich, Magdeburg) has made invaluable technical contributions, such as the development of non-canonical amino acid metabolic labelling, click chemistry, and mutation of cell-biological enzymes (the BONCAT and FUNCAT techniques), enabling the labelling, purification, identification and visualization of newly synthesized proteins in neurons and other cells.

Advocacy for women in neuroscience
In addition to her research and professorship, Erin Schuman has been committed to promoting the professional advancement of women in the field of neuroscience. Schuman made it a condition of her recruitment to Max Planck that a new child care facility be built on campus. She also spearheaded an initiative outlining changes in recruitment practices aimed at doubling the percentage of female directors in the Max Planck Society's Biology & Medicine
Section to 20% by 2020. In 2018, she received the Society for Neuroscience Mika Salpeter Lifetime Achievement Award in for her teaching, mentoring, and advocacy.

Awards and recognition
Selected awards:
 2022 - Rosenstiel Award
 2020 - Louis-Jeantet Prize for Medicine
 2018 - Society for Neuroscience, Salpeter Lifetime Achievement Award 
 2017 - Elected Member Academia Europaea
 2017 - Elected Member German National Academy of Sciences Leopoldina
 2017 - European Research Council, Advanced Investigator Grant 
 2016 - Forbes Lectures, Marine Biological Laboratory 
 2014 - Elected EMBO member 
 2013 - Alexander Cruickshank Lecture, Gordon Research Conference 
 2013 - Hodgkin-Huxley-Katz Prize
 2013 - Norbert Elsner Lecture, German Neuroscience Society 
 2011 - European Research Council, Advanced Investigator Grant 
 2005 - Howard Hughes Medical Institute Investigator
 2002 - Howard Hughes Medical Institute Associate Investigator 
 1997 - Howard Hughes Medical Institute Assistant Investigator
 1996 - Ferguson Biology Undergraduate Teaching Prize 
 1996-1998 - Beckman Young Investigator Award
 1995 - Ferguson Biology Graduate Teaching Prize
 1995 - American Association of University Women Emerging Scholar
 1995-1999 - Pew Biomedical Scholar 
 1994-1998 - John Merck Scholar 
 1994-1996 - Alfred P. Sloan Research Fellow 
 1994-1996 - McKnight Scholars Award (declined) 
 1991 - Katherine McCormick Foundation fellow
 1990 - NIH postdoctoral fellowship
 1986 - NIH predoctoral fellow
 1985 - Phi Beta Kappa, graduation with honors
 1985 - Sigma Xi Outstanding Undergraduate Research Award

References

External links
https://brain.mpg.de/research/schuman-department

American neuroscientists
American women neuroscientists
1963 births
Living people
Members of the German Academy of Sciences Leopoldina
21st-century American women
University of Southern California alumni
Princeton University alumni
California Institute of Technology faculty
Max Planck Institute directors